Sergey Aleksandrovich Musaelyan (born November 23, 1950, in Moscow) is a Russian pianist.

Life and career

Parents
Musaelyan's father, Aleksander Musaelyan, a mining engineer,  took part in the construction of the first Moscow metro. His mother, Eleonor Musaelyan (née Balayan), Honored Worker of Culture of Russian SFSR, was a music teacher; she studied under Konstantin Igumnov and Alexander Goedicke in the Moscow Conservatory, and went on to work at the Central Music School of the Moscow Conservatory.

Education
Musaelyan's first piano lessons were with his mother Eleonor Musaelyan. In 1958 he was admitted to the Central Music School of the Moscow Conservatory and studied with A.Sumbatyan, T.Bobovitch, E.Musaelyan and E.Timakin. After studying in the Central Music School he was admitted to the Moscow Conservatory. He studied first with G.Axelrod and then with Professor Y.Flier who was a teacher and pianist,  and People's Artist of the USSR. After Conservatory Musaelyan entered the graduate school Gnessin Institute and studied with Professor B.Berlin.

Career
He took part in the 1976 Vianna da Motta International Music Competition in Lisbon. That year he joined Mosconcert and began to give concerts across the USSR.

In 1988 Sviatoslav Richter took an interest in Sergey Musaelyan's career. Initially, Richter in his diaries gave Musaelyan quite contradictory characterisations. However, Richter began to support Musaelyan, and thanks to his help the pianist started to give concerts outside the Soviet Union. Since the late 80s and 90s Sergey Musaelyan has toured in Europe, North and South America, Korea, and China.

In 1988 Sergey Musaelyan met famous Finnish musicologist and journalist Seppo Heikinheimo. Musaelyan has given more than 100 concerts in Finland for a year with Heikinheimo's help. In 1989 the pianist gave a recital for the Red Cross in Geneva. Together with Araik Babajanyan, he founded the Arno Babajanyan Memorial Foundation in 1990. Festivals in memory of Babajanyan have been organized in Moscow, Yerevan and Los Angeles. The first international chamber music festival to be held in Mikkeli (Finland) had Musaelyan as Artistic Director and Vladimir Ashkenazy as Honorary President. After 2000 the pianist gave concerts in Russia and toured the United States, Denmark and Poland.

In 2011, Sergey Musaelyan was involved in the creation of the Yakov Flier Piano Arts Development Fund. He participated in a festival to mark Flier's 100th anniversary in 2012. The festival was also attended by other students of Flier: M.Pletnev with the Russian National Orchestra, V.Feltsman, I.Berkovich, D.Ratser, A.Zandmanis, M.Abramyan, I.Olovnikov and others.

Since 2005 Sergey Musaelyan has also been engaged in teaching, giving master classes at University of Texas–Pan American (USA, Texas) and the M.M.Ippolitov-Ivanov State Musical Pedagogical Institute in Moscow, and lecturing on pianistic art in different countries. 

Sergey Musaelyan's piano repertoire includes works from Bach to contemporary composers. He has a particular focus on the works of Chopin and Rachmaninoff.

Sergey Musaelyan at different times has performed with such conductors as Vladimir Ashkenazy, Valery Gergiev, Ulf Soderblom, Mikhail Pletnev, Osmo Vanska, Saulius Sondeckis, Fuat Mansurov, Peter Dabrowski, Kristjan Järvi, Konstantin Krimets.

Honours 
 Honored artist of Russian Federation (1999)

References

External links 
 «Novaya gazeta», 05.11.2001
 «Snob magazine», 22.02.2013
 Russian Documentary Film Festival in New York
 «Several conversation about nothing» (1991)
 «Sviatoslav Richter: Notebooks and Conversations» Bruno Monsaingeon (2002)

Moscow Conservatory alumni
Honored Artists of the Russian Federation
21st-century pianists
20th-century pianists
Russian pianists
Soviet pianists
1950 births
Living people